Tahdziú Municipality (Yucatec Maya: "place of the strong Tziu bird") is one of the 106 municipalities in the Mexican state of Yucatán containing (53.65 km2) of land and is located roughly  southeast of the city of Mérida.

History
There is no accurate data on when the town was founded, but it was a settlement before the conquest. After colonization, the area became part of the encomienda system with Juan Magaña Arroyo and Juan de Argais y Cienfuegos, serving as encomenderos over 360 indigenous people.

Yucatán declared its independence from the Spanish Crown in 1821, and in 1825 the area was assigned to the High Sierra partition with headquarters in Tekax Municipality. In 1867, it was moved to the jurisdiction of the Peto Municipality before being confirmed as its own municipality in 1988.

Governance
The municipal president is elected for a three-year term. The town council has four councilpersons, who serve as Secretary and councilors of public security; cleanliness, hygiene and public sanitation; public monuments; and nomenclature.

The Municipal Council administers the business of the municipality. It is responsible for budgeting and expenditures and producing all required reports for all branches of the municipal administration. Annually it determines educational standards for schools.

The Police Commissioners ensure public order and safety. They are tasked with enforcing regulations, distributing materials and administering rulings of general compliance issued by the council.

Communities
The head of the municipality is Tahdziú, Yucatán. The municipality has 30 populated places besides the seat including Mocte, San Isidro Uno, Santa Margarita and Timul. The significant populations are shown below:

Local festivals
Every year on 18 April there is a feast to celebrate Saint Peter the Apostle and from 7 to 12 August, the town celebrates a festival for its patron, San Lorenzo.

Tourist attractions
 Church of San Lorenzo, built during the seventeenth century
 archeological site at Sitpach
 archeological site at Xemas 
 Hacienda Xtabay

References

Municipalities of Yucatán